Rattlesnake Annie is a self-titled studio album by American singer and songwriter Rattlesnake Annie, released in 1987 on the CBS label. It reached #49 in the US country charts. Two singles were released from the album, "Callin' Your Bluff" which reached #79 in the US and #51 in the Canadian country charts, and "Somewhere South of Macon" which also reached #79 in the US country charts. The West German branch of Greenpeace adopted her song, "Goodbye to a River", as their anthem.

There were two other versions released in Europe in 1983 and 1988 on the Czechoslovakian Supraphon label. When she went to Europe she recorded an LP in Czechoslovakia, appeared on East German TV, was voted #1 female country star in Scotland and was filmed by a Swiss/French crew for The Other Side of Nashville, a MGM/UA documentary. By the time she returned to the US, she was a full-blown European country star.

Track listing
Side 1
"Funky Country Livin’" (Lonnie Mack) – 3:46
"Sixteen Tons" (M. Travis) – 2:43
"Country Music Hall of Pain" Rattlesnake Annie – 3:22
"Somewhere South of Macon" (J. Rushing/M. Chapman) – 2:46
"Goodbye to a River" (Rattlesnake Annie) – 3:41

Side 2
"Outskirts of Town" (Lonnie Mack) – 2:40
"Callin’ Your Bluff" (Lonnie Mack/M. D. Barnes) – 2:25
"Long Black Limousine" (V. Stovall/B. George) – 3:36
"Been Waiting That Long" (Lonnie Mack) – 3:25
"Lonesome On’ry and Mean" (Steve Young) – 3:24

Musicians
Willie Nelson
Lana Nelson
Lonnie Mack
Roy Huskey
Charlie McCoy
Johnny Gimble
Sam Bush
Jerry Douglas
Buddy Spicher
Vassar Clements
Buddy Blackmon
Vip Vipperman
Kenny Malone
Bobby Thompson
Byrd Burton
Mark Casstevens
Buddy Greene
David Schnaufer

Backing vocals
Carol Anderson
Mary Beth Anderson
Billy Smith
Terry Smith
Lonnie Mack
Rattlesnake Annie
Buddy Greene
Willie Nelson

Production
Producers: Rattlesnake Annie & Buddy Blackmon
Recorded at: Pedernales Recording Studios, Chips Moman’s Recording Studios, The Sound Shop, Tree Studios and Reflections Studios
Recording Engineers: Pat MacMakin, Larry Greenhill, David Cherry, Bobby Arnold and Gene Lawson
Mastered by: Denny Purcell at Georgetown Masters
Album Art Direction: Bill Johnson
Album Photography: McGuire

References

1987 albums
CBS Records albums
Rattlesnake Annie albums